Joseph Baker Milam (March 13, 1899 – November 25, 1971) was an American football player and coach. He played for the Kansas City Cowboys if the National Football League (NFL)  in 1925.

Head coaching record

References

External links
 
 

1899 births
1989 deaths
American football ends
American football guards
American football tackles
East Central Tigers football coaches
Kansas City Cowboys (NFL) players
Phillips Haymakers football players
People from Alfalfa County, Oklahoma
Coaches of American football from Oklahoma
Players of American football from Oklahoma